Kong Ra is a district (amphoe) of Phatthalung province, southern Thailand.

Geography
Neighboring districts are (from the north clockwise) Srinagarindra, Mueang Phatthalung, Khao Chaison, and Tamot of Phatthalung Province, Palian and Yan Ta Khao of Trang province.

History
The minor district (king amphoe) was created on 1 October 1975, when the three tambons Kong Ra, Khlong Chaloem, and Charat were split off from Mueang Phatthalung district. It was upgraded to a full district on 13 July 1981.

Administration
The district is divided into five sub-districts (tambons), which are further subdivided into 45 villages (mubans). There are no municipal (thesaban) areas. There are five tambon administrative organizations (TAO).

References

External links
amphoe.com

Districts of Phatthalung province